Gyula Gózon (19 April 1885 – 8 October 1972) was a Hungarian actor and comedian.

Life
Gyula Gózon was born on 19 April 1885, in Érsekújvár, but grew up in Esztergom. With the mentoring of his brother, he could fulfill his dream of learning to be a singer actor at the actor school of Szidi Rákosi in Budapest. After graduating, he joins a group touring the southern part of the country, often working under harsh conditions, changing location and repertory often. During this period he has the chance to polish his prosaic capabilities, one that was omitted in Rákosi's school. After playing in Târgu Mureş and Miercurea Ciuc, he gains the attention of Miklós Erdélyi, the director of Oradea's theater, who offers him contract in 1904. He plays here for six years, and befriends Gyula Kabos, forming a lifelong comradeship, and comedic duo. In 1912 Endre Nagy offers him to join his newly forming Cabaret (Apolló theatre) in Budapest, followed by years working in the Népopera and Király Theatre. Gózon accepted his first movie role in 1914 (the silent film A becsapott újságíró), appearing nearly a hundred during his lifetime.  In 1917 he marries Lili Berky, with whom he starts the Muskátli Cabaret, often appearing on stage together. After the venture failed in 1920, he joins the Belvárosi Theatre in 1927, followed by the Új Theatre two years later.

With Gyula Kabos he gets a role in Kék Bálvány, Hungary's first major motion picture, and like his mate, Gózon quickly becomes a much used actor of the emerging movie industry, appearing in the first hits of Budapest's theatres, like Hyppolit a lakáj or Meseautó.  In 1935, along with his wife, he is contracted to the National Theatre). On the account of Jew-laws, he is banned from work in 1941, followed by years of hiding in his Rákosliget home during World War II. In 1945 Gózon re-joins the National Theatre, enjoying a second flowering of his career for a decade. After his wife's death in 1958, the health of the now 73-year-old actor began to fail, and seven years after his last appearance in the National Theatre, he died on 8 October 1972.

Legacy
Gyula Gózon is one of the few entertainers who could be successful and active all along the years of the Monarchy, the Horthy regime, and the Communist rule. Throughout his long career, he appeared in over 90 movies (including silent ones), and was both a pioneer and master of the Hungarian Cabaret. He received the Kossuth Prize in 1954. His former home in Rákosliget is now home to the Gózon Gyula Repertory Theater, opened in 2005.

Filmography

1914 A becsapott újságíró (silent)
1931 A kék bálvány
1931 Hyppolit, a lakáj
1932 Tavaszi zápor
1932 Csókolj meg, édes
1933 Pardon tévedtem
1933 Rákóczi induló
 A Night in Venice (1934)
1933 Mindent a nőért
1934 
1934 Az új rokon
 The Dream Car (1934)
1934 Lila akác
 Romance of Ida (1934)
1934 Iglói diákok
1934 Emmy
1934 Márciusi mese
1935 Köszönöm, hogy elgázolt
1935 Szerelmi álmok
1935 Villa for Sale
1935 Budai cukrászda
1935 Édes mostoha
1935 Szent Péter esernyője
1935 Nem élhetek muzsikaszó nélkül
1935 A királyné huszárja
1935 A csúnya lány
1936 Három sárkány
1936 Zivatar Kemenespusztán
1936 Mária nővér
1936 A titokzatos idegen
1937 Lovagias ügy
1937 Az ember néha téved
1937 Egy lány elindul
1937 Segítség, örököltem
1938 A Noszty fiú esete Tóth Marival
 Rézi Friday (1938)
1938 Borcsa Amerikában
1938 Tizenhárom kislány mosolyog az égre
1938 János vitéz
1939 Semmelweis
1940 A szerelem nem szégyen
1940 Szarajevo
1940 Zavaros éjszaka
1940 Erdélyi kastély
1940 Rózsafabot
1945 Aranyóra
1945 Hazugság nélkül
1945 Tanítónő
1946 Mesél a film
1947 Könnyű múzsa
1948 Beszterce ostroma
1949 Janika
1950 Dalolva szép az élet
1951 Tűzkeresztség
1951 Különös házasság
1951 Déryné
1951 Civil a pályán
 The State Department Store (1953)
1953 Ifjú szívvel
1954 Rokonok
1954 Én és a nagyapám
1954 Fel a fejjel
1954 Simon Menyhért születése
1955 Különös ismertetőjel
1956 A csodacsatár
1957 Gerolsteini kaland
1959 Pár lépés a határ
1959 Tegnap
1960 Három csillag
 I'll Go to the Minister (1962)
1961 Puskák és galambok
1961 Nem ér a nevem
1961 Amíg holnap lesz
1962 Esős vasárnap
1963 Pacsirta
1963 Új Gilgames
1964 A kőszívű ember fiai I-II.
1964 Aranysárkány

Sources
Bálint, Lajos. Mind csak Színház. Budapest: Szépirodalmi Könyvkiadó, 1975. 
Gyula Gózon in the Hungarian Theatrical Lexicon (György, Székely. Magyar Színházművészeti Lexikon. Budapest: Akadémiai Kiadó, 1994. ), freely available on mek.oszk.hu

External links

Official site of the Gózon Gyula Repertory Theater
Biography on szineszkonyvtar.hu
 

1885 births
1972 deaths
Hungarian male film actors
Hungarian male silent film actors
20th-century Hungarian male actors
Hungarian male stage actors
Hungarian comedians
People from Nové Zámky
20th-century comedians